El Tío (The Uncle), is believed in Cerro Rico, Potosí, Bolivia to be the "Lord of the Underworld". There are many statues of this devil-like spirit in the mines of Cerro Rico. El Tío is believed to rule over the mines, simultaneously offering protection and destruction. Some figures are in the shape of a goat.

Miners bring offerings such as cigarettes, coca leaves, and alcohol for the statues and believe that if El Tío is not fed, he will take matters into his own hands. Villagers of Potosi ritually slaughter a llama and smear its blood on the entrance to the mines.

The miners of Cerro Rico are Catholics and they believe in both Christ and El Tío. However, worship of El Tío is condemned  strongly by the Catholic Church. Images of El Tío are usually not allowed outside of the mines, as this is seen as the realm of God and El Tío has no place there. Likewise, Christian symbolism are not allowed inside of the mines, as this "Underworld" is seen as El Tío's realm.

Every year, the Carnaval de Oruro is held, and costumes and statues of El Tío are paraded around in a ceremony that represents his defeat at the hands of the Archangel Michael. This is the only time that images of El Tío are allowed above the surface of the mines.

In popular culture 
 The figure is featured in the music video for the 2013 song "La La La" by producer Naughty Boy in collaboration with singer Sam Smith, which takes place in various locations across Bolivia.
 The figure appears in Tom Clancy's Ghost Recon Wildlands, which takes place in a fictional version of Bolivia.
 The French progressive-metal band, Hypno5e, has dedicated a song to El Tío in their third album "Shores of the abstract line", named "Central Shore - Tío".

See also 
Animal sacrifice
Cult image
Death deity
Idolatry
Maximón
Tutelary deity

References

External links 
 The Tío of the Mine, Víctor Montoya
 El Tío, Citizendium
 Photos of El Tio, Potosí mine, Bolivia, Flickr
 }
 Ghost Recon Wildlands: El Tio de la Mina Challenge


Christianity and religious syncretism
Ethnic religion
Potosí
Religion in Bolivia
Demons